El mesero is a 2020 Mexican comedy film directed by Raúl Martínez. The film stars Vadhir Derbez, and Bárbara López. The production of the film began on June 21, 2019 in Mexico City. The plot revolves around Rodrigo Sada a young waiter, who wants to be a millionaire to lead the life of luxury and sophistication he sees in the clients of the restaurant where he works. His ambition leads him to take an easy route to try to get what he wants. It is written jointly between Raúl and Alberto Bremer, and was released on 3 December 2020.

Cast 
 Vadhir Derbez as Rodrigo
 Bárbara López as Mariana
 Emiliano Zurita as Pedro
 Arturo Barba as Saviñon
 Sabine Moussier as Estela
 Gustavo Sánchez Parra as Pasilla
 Ignacia Allamand as Executive woman
 Ariel Levy as Samuel
 Claudio Lafarga as Patrick
 Ruy Senderos as Cliente 1
 Lizbeth Rodríguez
 Guillermo Villegas as Luis
 Franco Escamilla as Taquero

References

External links 
 

Mexican comedy films
2020 films
2020 comedy films
2020s Mexican films